"He's Got Tact" is a song written and recorded by English girl group Bananarama.  The song was written as a commercial jingle for the Honda Tact motor scooter and released to the Japanese market only.  The popularity of the jingle prompted London Records to release the song on a 7-inch single and add the song to the Japanese version of Bananarama's debut album Deep Sea Skiving.

"He's Got Tact" can be found on the 2007 UK reissue of Deep Sea Skiving as one of five bonus tracks.

Track listings
7" vinyl

"He's Got Tact"  2:59
"Give Us Back Our Cheap Fares"  2:44

1983 singles
Bananarama songs
London Records singles
Songs written by Sara Dallin
Songs written by Siobhan Fahey
Songs written by Keren Woodward
1982 songs